O'Sheas Casino is a casino located within The Linq, a hotel-casino and shopping promenade on the Las Vegas Strip in Paradise, Nevada. O'Sheas originally opened in 1989 and operated in between the Imperial Palace Hotel and Casino (later The Linq) and the Flamingo Las Vegas.

Owner Caesars Entertainment Corporation announced in 2011 that O'Sheas would close and be relocated to become part of the company's new shopping promenade nearby, known as The Linq. O'Sheas reopened in its new location on December 27, 2013. The revitalized O'Sheas has three bars - the main Dublin Up Bar, the Lucky Bar and the exterior-facing Blarney Bar. The casino includes beer pong tables, a stage, a dance floor and a pit with games including blackjack, roulette, and craps.

History

Hilton Nevada Corporation broke ground for the Irish-themed O'Sheas casino on September 7, 1988, with an opening planned for June 1, 1989. The project was built on the Las Vegas Strip, north of the company's Flamingo Hilton hotel-casino. The five-story building included three floors for parking space. Its target clientele was middle-income tourists. R. Duell & Associates of Los Angeles was the designer, and Rissman & Rissman of Las Vegas was the architect. O'Sheas was designed to resemble an Irish pub, and would include hardwood floors, brass, Irish artifacts, and detailed wall designs. The casino would include 650 slot machines, 19 table games, keno, and a sportsbook, as well as a lounge, snack bar, and restaurant.

Construction was still underway in May 1989, and O'Sheas opened later that year. It was operated in conjunction with the Flamingo Hilton. Unlike most of the casinos on the Las Vegas Strip, prior to this date O'Sheas was not part of a resort and had no hotel. O'Sheas was briefly featured in the 1997 movie Vegas Vacation, when character, Rusty Griswold, won a car through a slot machine sitting outside the casino.

On February 26, 2000, O'Sheas made the 2001 edition of the Guinness Book of World Records by having 220 patrons contribute to the largest crowd to participate in a nationwide toast. The Great Guinness Toast, as it is called, was tallied nationwide as having 320,470 participants. That easily broke the previous year's record of 197,846 participants. In 2006, Vince Neil, lead singer of the band Mötley Crüe, opened Vince Neil Ink, a tattoo parlor inside of O'Sheas. It featured a room called "The Stage" that was visible from the Las Vegas Strip, so visitors could watch the tattoo artists work from outside.

Relocation

Owner Caesars Entertainment Corporation announced in August 2011 that as part of The Linq shopping project nearby, O'Sheas would close and be relocated there. O'Sheas closed on April 30, 2012. On May 1, 2012, the 7 story parking structure for O'Sheas was imploded as part of The Linq project. O'Sheas reopened on December 27, 2013, located in The Linq shopping promenade. The new location contains . It is also connected to the casino floor at The Linq hotel-casino (formerly known as The Quad and the Imperial Palace).

Casino
O'Sheas targets, and typically attracts, younger crowds in their 20s and early 30s. The casino offered low minimums on table games, a poker room, and a World Series of Beer Pong branded beer pong area. Before being purchased by Caesars Entertainment (known then as Harrah's Entertainment), O'Sheas branded itself as having low minimums and liberal rules on table games, thus attempting to draw "locals" and savvy, low-minimum gamblers. After being acquired by Harrah's, O'Sheas generally offered the least advantageous table games in Nevada (i.e., bad for players), especially on Blackjack (where Blackjack only paid 6:5 on all games), and had branded itself as a "party" casino. The casino offers five beer pong tables in addition to the other games.

Gallery

References

External links

 

1989 establishments in Nevada
Caesars Entertainment
Casinos completed in 1989
Casinos in the Las Vegas Valley
Buildings and structures demolished in 2012
Las Vegas Strip